The Tour of Sharjah, formerly the Sharjah International Cycling Tour, is a men's stage cycle race which takes place in the United Arab Emirates and is rated by the UCI as 2.2 from 2013–2015 and again since 2022 and as 2.1 from 2016–2018. It is part of the UCI Asia Tour. The race had a three-year hiatus after the 2018 edition, before being revived in 2022.

Winners

References

UCI Asia Tour races
Cycle races in the United Arab Emirates
2013 establishments in the United Arab Emirates
2018 disestablishments in the United Arab Emirates
Recurring sporting events established in 2013
Recurring sporting events disestablished in 2018
Autumn events in the United Arab Emirates